Estadio Cívitas Nuevo Vivero is a multi-use stadium in Badajoz, Spain.  It is currently used mostly for football matches and is the home ground of CD Badajoz. The stadium holds 14,175 and was built in 1999. They previously played at Estadio El Vivero, in the east part of the city, before moving a few kilometres south of the Guadiana, in 1999, to this purpose-built-arena. The stadium has hosted three full internationals for the Spain national team and one of the women's national team.

On 8 September 1999, Spain beat Cyprus 8–0 in a UEFA Euro 2000 qualification group match. Nearly seven years later, on 2 September 2006, Spain returned to the Estadio Nuevo Vivero and beat Liechtenstein in a qualification group match for the UEFA Euro 2008, 4-0.

On 1 December 2015, Spain beat Portugal in a qualification game for the UEFA Women's Euro 2017, 2–0.

On 5 September 2021, Spain beat Georgia 4-0 in a 2022 World Cup UEFA Group B match.

References

External links 
Photos in June 2007
Photos in September 2019
Estadios de Espana 

Football venues in Extremadura
CD Badajoz
Buildings and structures in Badajoz
Sport in Badajoz
Sports venues completed in 1999
1999 establishments in Spain